Malik, Maleek, Malek or Malyk (Arabic: مَالِك or مَلِك) (Urdu & (Persian): مالک)  is a given name of Arabic origin.
It is both used as first name and surname mainly in several Muslim countries and communities.

Several Semitic language traditions uses its homonym and other different versions of it. In Arabic, Malik (Malek) مَالِك means owner, and Malyk (Malyeek) مَلِك means king. 
Its homonym,  though other sounding,  Moloch also means king or lord in Aramaic, as does the Modern Hebrew מֶלֶךְ‏ (mélekh). It also means belonging of Amanda. These and many other forms in most of the Semitic languages stem from a common Proto-Semitic root.

Unrelated to the use in Arabic and Semitic languages, Malik is also a common first name for men in Greenland (the ninth most common in 2021), and it means "ocean wave" in Greenlandic.

People with the name

Given name

Malek
 Malek Ashraf (died 1357), a Chupanid ruler of northwestern Iran during the 14th century
 Malek Awab, Singaporean footballer 
 Malek Bennabi (1905-1973), Algerian writer and philosopher
Hasan Malek (born 1946), Malaysian politician
 Malek Boutih (born 1964), French politician and activist
 Malek Chergui (born 1988), French footballer of Algerian descent
 Malek Jandali (born 1972), German-born Syrian-American pianist and composer
Rami Malek (born 1981), American-Egyptian actor
 Malek Jaziri (born 1984), Tunisian tennis player
 Malek Koussa (born 1971), Syrian footballer
 Malek Maktabi, also known as Malik Maktaby, Lebanese television presenter
 Malek Mouath (born 1981), Saudi Arabian footballer

Malik
Malik Al Nasir (born 1966), British author and spoken word poet
Malik Ambar (1548–1626), Siddi military leader
 Imam Malik ibn Anas (ca. 711–795), Islamic scholar of jurisprudence
Malik Amin Aslam (born 1966), Pakistani environmentalist and politician
Malik Abdul Basit (1972–2020), American rapper known as Malik B.
Malik Bendjelloul (1977–2014), Swedish documentary filmmaker, journalist and actor
Malik Cunningham (born 1998), American football player
Malik Dinar (died 748), Persian scholar and traveller
Malik Fitts (born 1997), American basketball player
Mälık Ğabdullin (1915–1973), Kazakh-Soviet writer, professor, philologist, participant of the Great Patriotic War
Malik Harrison (born 1998), American football player
Malik Henry (born 1998), American football player
Malik Herring (born 1997), American football player
Malik Jackson (disambiguation), multiple people
Malik Jefferson (born 1996), American football player
Malik Kafur (died 1316), first Hindu (later converted to Islam) and prominent military general of Delhi Sultan Alauddin Khalji
Malik Maharramov (1920–2004), Soviet–Azerbaijani soldier and Hero of the Soviet Union
Malik Monk (born 1998), American basketball player
Malik Müller (born 1994), German basketball player
Malik Newman (born 1997), American basketball player
Malik Obama (born 1958), Kenyan–American businessman and half-brother of Barack Obama
Malik Reed (born 1996), American football player
Malik Riaz (born 1954), Pakistani businessman and real estate developer
Malik Saad (1959–2007), Pakistani police officer
 El-Hajj Malik El-Shabazz, The Muslim name of Malcolm X (Malcolm Little) (1925–1965), African-American Muslim minister and human rights activist
Malik Shah, multiple Seljuk sultans
Malik Izaak Taylor (1970–2016), American rapper known as Phife Dawg
Malik Taylor (American football) (born 1995), American football player
Malik Tillman (born 2002), German footballer
Malik Willis (born 1999), American football player
Malik Yoba (born 1967), American actor and singer
Malik Yusef (born 1971), American spoken word poet, rapper, writer, actor and producer

Malick
Malick Badiane (born 1984), Senegalese basketball player
Malick Mane (born 1988), Senegalese footballer
Malick Sidibé (1935/36–2016), Malian photographer
Malick Sall (born 1956), Senegalese lawyer and politician
Malick Sy (1855–1922), Senegalese Sufi leader

Maleek
Maleek Berry (born 1987), British record producer and recording artist
Maleek Irons (born 1996), Canadian football player

Malyk
Malyk Hamilton (born 1999), Canadian soccer player

Malique
Malique Ibrahim (born 1977), Malaysian rapper

Surname

Malik
Aamir Ali Malik (born 1977), Indian actor and model
Abd al-Malik ibn Marwan (644/647–705), Umayyad caliph
Adam Malik (1917–1984), Indonesian politician and journalist
Adnan Malik (born 1984), Pakistani actor, director and producer
Akhtar Hussain Malik (died 1969), Pakistani general
Amaal Malik (born 1991), Indian music director, composer and singer
Ammar Malik (born 1987) American songwriter
Anas ibn Malik (c. 612–c. 712), Companion of the Prophet Muhammad
Angeline Malik (born 1975), Pakistani director, actor, producer, model and activist
Anmol Malik, Indian author, singer and songwriter
Armaan Malik (born 1995), Indian singer, songwriter, record producer and actor
Anu Malik (born 1960), Indian music director and singer
Art Malik (born 1952), Pakistani-born British actor
Ayisha Malik, British writer of Pakistani descent
Charles Malik (1906–1987), Lebanese philosopher and diplomat
Dua Malik, Pakistani singer
Fredmund Malik (born 1944), Austrian economist and management consultant
Habib Malik (born 1954), Lebanese–American professor of history and cultural studies 
Haidar Malik (died 1627), Mughal administrator and soldier
Himanshu Malik (born 1973), Indian actor, screenwriter and producer
Hisham ibn Abd al-Malik (691–743), Umayyad caliph
Jan Malík (born 1992), Czech footballer
Jana Malik (born 1974), Pakistani actress
Jawad Rafique Malik, Pakistani civil servant
Jitendra Malik (born 1960), computer vision researcher
Kenan Malik (born 1960), Indian-born English writer, lecturer and broadcaster
Keshav Malik (born 1924), Indian poet, critic, art scholar and curator
Koel Malik (born 1982), Indian actress
Maszlee Malik (born 1974), Malaysian politician
Marek Malík (born 1975), Czech ice hockey player
Meghna Malik, Indian actress
Michael J. Malik Sr (born 1954), American developer and entrepreneur
Mohit Malik (born 1982), Indian actor
Muhammad Asad Malik (1941–2020), Pakistani field hockey player
Nikunj Malik (born 1989), Indian actress
Osama Malik (born 1990), Australian soccer player
Rehman Malik (1951–2022), Pakistani politician and special agent
Sakshi Malik (born 1992), Indian wrestler
Saleem Malik (born 1963), Pakistani cricketer
Satya Pal Malik (born 1946), Indian politician
Shoaib Malik (born 1982), Pakistani cricketer
Shoaib Malik , Pakistani cricketer
Štefan Malík (born 1966), Slovak racewalker
Steve Malik, American businessman and sports executive
Syed Abdul Malik (1919–2000), Indian writer
Tashfeen Malik (1986–2015), Pakistani terrorist
Ved Prakash Malik, Indian general
Veena Malik (born 1984), Pakistani actress
Yakov Malik (1906–1980), Soviet diplomat
Yasin Malik (born 1966), Kashmiri–Indian separatist leader
Zayn Malik (born 1993), English singer and songwriter

Malick
Peter Malick (born 1951), American musician
Terrence Malick (born 1943), American director
Wendie Malick (born 1950), American actress and fashion model

Malyk
 Mitchel Malyk (born 1995), Canadian luger
 Vasyl Malyk (born 1968), former Soviet and Ukrainian footballer and Ukrainian football coach
 Volodymyr Malyk (1921–998), Soviet-Ukrainian writer

Fictional characters
Malek the Paladin, a fictional character from the video game series Legacy of Kain
 Malik Al-Sayf, a fictional character from the video game series Assassin's Creed
 Malik, a fictional character from the Malaysian film series KL Gengster
Malik Begum, the main protagonist of the British web series Corner Shop Show played by Islah Abdur-Rahman
 Malik Caesar, a fictional character in the 2009 video game Tales of Graces
 Faridah Malik, a fictional character from the 2011 video game Deus Ex: Human Revolution
Sally Malik, a fictional character in the television series Being Human
Malik Wright, a character from the American comedy-drama television series The Game (since 2006)
Malik Ishtar, a character from Japanese manga and anime series 'Yu-Gi-Oh'
 Jack Malik, the protagonist in the 2019 movie Yesterday

References

Arabic masculine given names
Surnames of Ukrainian origin
Ukrainian-language surnames